Khalid Al Zari (Arabic:خالد الزري) (born 13 May 1996) is an Emirati footballer. He currently plays as a right back for Ittihad Kalba. .

Career

Al-Sharjah
Al Zari started his career at Al-Sharjah and is a product of the Al-Sharjah's youth system. On 22 January 2016, Al Zari made his professional debut for Al-Sharjah against Al-Jazira in the Pro League, replacing Maicosuel .

He was playing with Al-Sharjah and after merging Al-Sharjah, and Al-Shaab clubs under the name Al-Sharjah he was joined to Al-Sharjah.

Ajman
On 22 June 2018, left Al-Sharjah and signed with Ajman. On 26 October 2018 , Al Zari made his professional debut for Ajman against Al-Ain in the Pro League, replacing Mohammed Ahmad .

References

External links
 

Emirati footballers
1996 births
Living people
Sharjah FC players
Ajman Club players
Al-Ittihad Kalba SC players
UAE Pro League players
Association football fullbacks